Mariotti is an Italian surname that may refer to

Alberto Mariotti (born 1935), Argentinean association football player
Alessandro Mariotti (born 1998), San Marinese alpine skier
Carlo Speridone Mariotti (1726–1790), Italian painter
Charlie Mariotti (born 1958), Dominican politician, manager, and broadcaster 
Filippo Mariotti (1833–1911), Italian politician and lawyer
Francesco Mariotti (born 1942), artist and cultural activist
Frédéric Mariotti (1883–1971), French stage and film actor 
Giuseppe Mariotti (born 1963), Italian classical pianist
Jay Mariotti (born 1959), American sports commentator and writer
The Mariotti Show, a web radio show 
Jean-Marie Mariotti (1955–1998), French astronomer
7972 Mariotti, a minor planet 
John Mariotti (born 1984), American baseball pitcher
Luigi Mariotti (1912–2004), Italian politician
Maria Mariotti (born 1964), Italian  association football player
Massimo Mariotti (born 1961), retired Swiss footballer
Michele Mariotti  (born 1979), Italian conductor
Nicholas Mariotti American businessman, Managing Partner of E E Revering Holding Company
Paolo Mariotti (born 1979), Sammarinese association football player
Renato Mariotti, American attorney and legal commentator
Sergio Mariotti (born 1946), Italian chess player
Steve Mariotti (born 1953), American social entrepreneur and educator

See also
Marotti

Italian-language surnames